Robert Farken (born 20 September 1997) is a German athlete specialising in middle distance running. He is German outdoor champion and a four time German indoor champion, earning him the nickname “Farken fast”.

From Leipzig, and a high school graduate at the sports high school there. He had a promising start to his career before an achilles tendon injury slowed his progress. In 2016 Farken was runner-up over 800m at the German youth indoor championships. In the same year he was the fastest U20 runner in Europe over 800m. Farken ran this best time at the evening sports festival in Pfungstadt, but this came after the selection period for participation in the U20 World Championships in Bydgoszcz had finished so he was not able to compete. In 2017 Farken became German indoor champion over 800 meters in his first start in the men's class in Leipzig. At the evening sports festival in Erfurt  on January 27, he qualified for the indoor European championships in Belgrade with a personal best of 1:47.65 minutes.

In June 2021, in Braunschweig, he not only ran a championship record (3:34.64 minutes) over 1500m,  but he also made the Olympic qualifying time ensuring his place at the delayed 2020 Tokyo Olympics, a great result for the many Germans waiting to see Farken in the Olympics. In Tokyo Farken qualified from his heat before finishing in eighth in his semi final race. Despite his early exit from medal contention, he managed to earn the nickname “Farken Fast”. In February, 2022 Farken became German champion over 1500 metres indoors for the first time, winning at his home track in Leipzig.

References

1997 births
Living people
German male middle-distance runners
Athletes from Leipzig
Athletes (track and field) at the 2020 Summer Olympics
Olympic athletes of Germany